The 2014 PLSQ season was the third season of existence for the Première ligue de soccer du Québec, a Division 3 men's semi-professional soccer league and the highest level of soccer fully contained within the province of Québec.  It is below Major League Soccer and the North American Soccer League in the Canadian soccer league system, and on the same level as League1 Ontario.

CS Mont-Royal Outremont were the defending league and league cup champions from 2013.

CS Longueuil won the league championship this season, while FC Gatineau won the League cup.

Teams
The 2014 season was contested between six teams - four teams returning from the previous season, with CS Longueuil and ACP Montréal-Nord joining the league while FC Boisbriand, FC Brossard, and the inaugural champion FC St-Léonard did not return. FC L'Assomption became known as FC L'Assomption-Lanaudière.

Season standings

Top scorers

Awards

Cup
CS Mont-Royal Outremont (as 2013's champion) and AS Blainville (by random draw) received byes through to the semi-finals.

First round

Semifinals

Final

Inter-Provincial Cup Championship 
The Inter-Provincial Cup Championship was announced on October 14, 2014 as a two-legged home-and-away series between the league champions of League1 Ontario and the Première ligue de soccer du Québec - the only Division 3 men's semi-professional soccer leagues based fully within Canada.

Toronto FC Academy won 4-0 on aggregate

References

External links

Premiere
Première ligue de soccer du Québec seasons